Weird Dreams is a cinematic platform game developed by Rainbird Software which was published for the Amiga, Atari ST, Commodore 64, and DOS. A modified version served as the visual component to a phone-in quiz on ITV's Motormouth. The game was planned for release on Amstrad CPC and ZX Spectrum, but both versions were cancelled.

Plot
The background story is told by a 64-page novella with 19 chapters written by Rupert Goodwins.

Steve is in love with his attractive coworker Emily. Unbeknownst to Steve, Emily is possessed by a daemon named Zelloripus who was banished to Earth, stripped of most of her powers, and trapped into a human female due to unspecified crimes done to other daemons. Emily sees a chance to let someone else suffer and stifle her boredom. She tricks Steve to take three pills she has mixed to "cure his flu". While the pills do cure him, they also grant Zelloripus access to his body and mind. His dreams become both more lucid and strange, each one getting more intense and painful. Steve's psychiatrist does not understand what causes the dreams, and neither does Steve. He refers him to a neurosurgeon. After his health dramatically declines, Steve undertakes brain surgery in an attempt to stop the dreams. Under an anaesthetic, he slips into one more dream, possibly his last.

Gameplay
The game starts where the novella ends, with Steve lying on the operating table and slipping into the dream world. Steve is controlled by the player through numerous surreal worlds. He can collect certain weapons and items on these levels, but with a few exceptions, cannot carry them to another level. Steve has no health meter, but there is a heart rate monitor, which goes from 75bpm (normal) to 100bpm (in frightening situations) to 170bpm (shortly before death). He immediately dies if he comes into contact with an enemy or an obstacle. He can also die if he remains too long in certain areas such as the Country Garden, where a lawnmower will come and decimate him. When Steve dies, the game returns to the scene in the operating room where the surgeons attempt to save him. There are no save points in the game, and instead of score points the player's progress is stated as a percentage and a time counter.

It is possible to activate an ingame cheat code for infinite lives: the player has to be standing in the right hand side mirror in the Hall of Mirrors (working as a hub to access the scenes) then input the morse code for S.O.S. (3 short strikes, 3 long strikes, 3 short strikes) using a specific key from the keyboard ('Help' key on Atari ST).

There are 15 different enemies/challenges, 7 different death animations and 5 different musical scores by C64/Amiga musician David Whittaker on the Amiga. Barry Leitch did the music for the Commodore 64 and PC version. The game also features a couple actual pieces of music, such as Country Gardens and Dance of the Sugar Plum Fairy.

Development
The general plot was conceived by the developers, and Rupert Goodwins was asked to write the novella included with the game.

The scenarios in the game are not based on Serrano's own nightmares, but are inspired by the paintings of Salvador Dalí, Terry Gilliam's cartoon animations for Monty Python, and on odd observations. After a visit to the dentist, Serrano developed a phobia of teeth, which is noticeable in the design of the monsters, many of them having mouths with large teeth.

The game took over a year to produce.

Release
Computer and Video Games did a competition called "Ooooh What a Nightmare Compo", which required participants to send a picture of their worst nightmares. The judging was done by a professional artist and the winners received blow-up fish bathtoys and Weird Dreams/Motormouth T-Shirts as prizes.

Reception

Weird Dreams received mixed reviews. While most critics praised its visual style, there were some criticisms depending on the game platform. Frustrating difficulty, long loading times, and a disappointing soundtrack were common criticisms, albeit not unanimous.

References

External links
Weird Dreams at Gamebase 64
Weird Dreams at Atari Mania
Weird Dreams at Lemon Amiga

1989 video games
Amiga games
Atari ST games
Cancelled Amstrad CPC games
Cancelled ZX Spectrum games
Commodore 64 games
DOS games
Telecomsoft games
Video games about nightmares
Video games scored by Barry Leitch
Video games scored by David Whittaker
Video games developed in the United Kingdom
1980s horror video games
Cinematic platform games